Apedale Hall was a manor house near Newcastle-under-Lyme in Staffordshire, it was rebuilt in 1826 by the Heathcote family in  the Elizabethan style by British Industrialist Richard Edensor Heathcote, (1780 - Genoa, Italy, 1850),  but was demolished in 1934, due to subsidence from the coal mines underneath.

Oswald Mosley,  British politician, known principally as the founder of the British Union of Fascists lived there for a time in the early 20th century with his divorced mother, Katharine Maud Edwards-Heathcote,  (1874–1950),  and his paternal grandfather Sir Oswald Mosley, 4th Baronet, of Ancoats, (1848–1915), before its demolition.

References

Further reading
 The House of Mitford by Jonathan Guinness, 3rd Baron Moyne, born 1930, with Catherine Guinness.  Hutchinson, 1984. 
Hitler and Churchill: Secrets of Leadership (2003), by controverted Conservative historian and visual media protagonist Andrew Roberts, born 1963. Weidenfeld and Nicolson, edts. London. 225 pages, .

Country houses in Staffordshire